Eberhard Taubert (11 May 1907 in Kassel – 2 November 1976 in Cologne) was a lawyer and anti-Semitic Nazi propagandist. He joined the Nazi party in 1931, and quickly became involved in both anti-Communist and anti-Jewish propaganda. From 1933 to 1945 he worked as a high official in the Propagandaministerium under Joseph Goebbels, where he headed its anti-Komintern department.

His nickname in Nazi circles was Dr. Anti. From 1939 he headed the Institute for the Study of the Jewish Question. He worked in 1940 on the script for the anti-Semitic propaganda film Der ewige Jude (English: The Eternal Jew) and was responsible for the law requiring Jews to wear the yellow badge (Judenstern).

After the Second World War he changed his name to Erwin Kohl and worked for $3,000 a month for the German Christian Democratic Union in West Germany, providing material against more radical Marxists. 

As "Erwin Kohl" Taubert was one of the founders of the People's Union for Peace and Freedom (VFF) in 1950. The VFF saw itself as “the central anti-communist organization in the Federal Republic” and was supported  and subsidized by the Federal Ministry for All-German Questions (predecessor of the Federal Ministry for Intra-German Relations). Mathias Friedel regarded the VFF as a replica of the "Anti-Komintern" during the Nazi regime. After his true identity and background was revealed, Eberhard had to retire from the VFF. 

After 1957 he worked in South America, Iran, Lebanon, Egypt and South Africa and as the counsel of the German minister Franz Josef Strauß. Taubert maintained a liaison office in Bonn, which worked for NATO on matters of psychological defense (PSV). 

Taubert was still a counter-intelligence expert for US secret services and in 1959 took on a job for the Iranian secret service (SAVAK)  and other Middle Eastern intelligence services. Under the pseudonym Dr. Marcel Wallensdorfer, Taubert was given a press service entitled Anti-Comintern Service.

From 1970 he was employed by German industrialists and largely withdrew from political life due to his illness. 

His rhetorical ability made him the talented and wanted propagandist he was, not only during the NS-regime. His agitative style used in the Nazi propaganda was reused after the war to boost the Western fear of communism. For this mission he worked with secret services (for example CIC) and right-wing politicians and journals.

References

Further reading 
 Max Weinreich : Hitler's Professors: The Part of Scholarship in Germany's Crimes Against the Jewish People, Publisher: Yale University Press; 2nd edition, 1999, 

1907 births
1976 deaths
Nazi propagandists
Commanders Crosses of the Order of Merit of the Federal Republic of Germany